Rana Asif Saeed Khan is a Lawyer of the Apex Court of Pakistan. Also served as Chief legal Advisor of Wapda. Has extensively worked as a criminal trial lawyer now conducting cases in  diversified fields mainly constitutional, criminal, service and NAB laws. Currently is also the legal advisor of the Women University Multan, Agriculture University Multan, various banks and multi-national companies. He has conducted more than 5000 cases in high court. More than 125 cases conducted by him have been reported in renowned Law Journals of Pakistan. He has been Chairman Executive of Punjab Bar Council. He has been the General Secretary and President of District Bar association. He was the youngest ever member of Punjab Bar Council having only 7 years standing at the age of 32. He was elected as a Member of the Punjab Bar Council twice..Participated as keynote speaker in local and international law conferences. Participated in international arbitration proceedings. He belongs to Khanewal Pakistan and currently settled in Multan Pakistan.

Personal information

Date of Birth: 15-04-1967

Father : Rana Muhammad Arshad Saeed renowned agriculturist

Spouse : Riffat Asif Rana is Advocate of high court Lahore

References

Chairmen of the Punjab Bar Council
Advocates
Pakistani lawyers
Living people
Year of birth missing (living people)